The Wilmington Blue Rocks are a Minor League Baseball team of the South Atlantic League and the High-A affiliate of the Washington Nationals. They are located in Wilmington, Delaware, and play their home games at Daniel S. Frawley Stadium.

Franchise history

The Blue Rocks played in the Carolina League, an advanced Single-A league in minor league baseball, from 1993 to 2020. The name "Blue Rocks" was chosen because of the blue granite found along the Brandywine River in Wilmington. The Blue Rocks play at Judy Johnson Field at Daniel S. Frawley Stadium in Wilmington's growing Riverfront district and was instrumental in bringing commerce and public attention to the once ignored and dilapidated area of the city.

The Blue Rocks played their first season in 1993 when the Peninsula Pilots were purchased and relocated to the riverfront in Wilmington, Delaware. Principal owner Frank Boulton and co-owner Bud Harrelson bought the franchise in 1992, moved the team from Hampton, Virginia, and changed their affiliation from the Seattle Mariners' farm system to the Kansas City Royals'. When the franchise moved to Wilmington in 1993, the ballpark was known as Legends Stadium, after the sports legends of Delaware. After Frawley, the Wilmington mayor who played a major role in the creation of the team, died while playing a recreational basketball game, the stadium was renamed Daniel S. Frawley Stadium in his honor.

The Blue Rocks were Kansas City farm team from their inception, except for the 2005 and 2006 seasons when the team was affiliated with the Boston Red Sox. In 2020, with the re-organization of the minor leagues, the Blue Rocks became an affiliate of the Washington Nationals.

In 2005, the Blue Rocks were featured in SportsCenter'''s 50 States in 50 Days. Matt Winer reported from a set in left field where SportsCenter did stories on the many mascots of the Blue Rocks. The Aug 19 game featuring SportsCenter'' drew the Blue Rocks' largest crowd in team history.

The Blue Rocks played host to the 2014 California/Carolina League All Star Game, having previously hosted the game last 12 years earlier in 2002. The California League All Stars ousted the Carolina League All Stars 3-2. Kyle Waldrop of the Bakersfield Blaze took home the game's MVP award.

On July 15, 2019, Jonathan Bowlan pitched the second no-hitter in franchise history against the Carolina Mudcats. He struck out nine batters, walking none on 97 pitches.

The Blue Rocks won the 2019 Mills Cup Championship for the first time since 1999, closing a five-game series with the Fayetteville Woodpeckers with a 2-0 victory on September 14, 2019.

In December 2020, the Blue Rocks were officially invited to become an affiliate of the Washington Nationals, joining the Nationals' minor league system beginning with the 2021 season. In further conjunction with Major League Baseball's restructuring of Minor League Baseball in 2021, the Blue Rocks were organized into the High-A East. In 2022, the High-A East became known as the South Atlantic League, the name historically used by the regional circuit prior to the 2021 reorganization.

Roster

Playoffs

Players of note
More than 130 Blue Rocks have gone on to the major leagues, including All-Stars Carlos Beltrán, Lance Carter, Johnny Damon, Zack Greinke, Jon Lieber, Jed Lowrie, José Rosado, and Mike Sweeney. Other former Blue Rock players of note include:

Jeremy Affeldt
Ángel Berroa
Brandon Berger
Ryan Bukvich
Tim Byrdak
Dee Brown
Clay Buchholz
Kiko Calero
David DeJesus
Danny Duffy
Chad Durbin
Mark Ellis
Jacoby Ellsbury
Sal Fasano
Carlos Febles
Mike Fyhrie
Byron Gettis
Jason Gilfillan 
Jimmy Gobble
Alexis Gómez
Raúl González
Rubén Gotay
Shane Halter
Ken Harvey
Runelvys Hernández
Norris Hopper
Eric Hosmer
Kila Ka'aihue
Mendy López
Ramon E. Martinez
Mike MacDougal
Sean Manaea
Mike Moustakas
Wes Obermueller
Kit Pellow
Paul Phillips
Mark Quinn
Rudy Rufer
Glendon Rusch
Brian Sanches
Aníbal Sánchez
José Santiago
Shawn Sedlacek
Andy Stewart
Larry Sutton
Matt Treanor
Michael Tucker

Retired numbers
18 Johnny Damon
33 Mike Sweeney
36 Robin Roberts, played for the earlier Blue Rocks team 
42 Jackie Robinson (retired throughout baseball)

Mascots
The Blue Rocks have three mascots. Rocky Bluewinkle is a blue moose. Mr. Celery is a stalk of celery who comes out and dances to "Song 2" by Blur whenever Wilmington scores a run. Rubble is a giant blue rock.

See also
 Delaware Sports Museum and Hall of Fame
 Wilmington Quicksteps
 Wilmington Park
 List of professional sports teams in Delaware

References

External links

 

Baseball teams established in 1993
1993 establishments in Delaware
Sports in Wilmington, Delaware
Professional baseball teams in Delaware
Wilmington Riverfront
Washington Nationals minor league affiliates
Kansas City Royals minor league affiliates
Boston Red Sox minor league affiliates
Carolina League teams
Sports in the Delaware Valley
High-A East teams
South Atlantic League teams